Türkoba or Tyurkoba may refer to:
 Türkoba, Khizi, Azerbaijan
 Türkoba, Masally, Azerbaijan